Nawab Nauroz (Nowroz) Khan (1874?–1965), also known by Balochs as Babu Nowroz, was the head of the Zarakzai (Zehri), a subject to the Khan of Kalat in Balochistan, Pakistan. After his unsuccessful insurgency against the government of that time he was imprisoned in Kohlu jail where he died in 1965.

Early years
Little is known about Nowroz Khan's early years.  He was born some time in the 1870s or 1880s (sources disagree on the date) at a time when Kalat was a princely state within the framework of the British Raj. By 1887 the British had reached a settlement with Kalat agreeing on limited autonomy in exchange for British authority in military affairs and external relationships, but the country remained instable, with periodic fighting against the authorities or between tribal groups.

Nauroz Khan became Nawab and leader of the Zehri tribe in the Jhalawan area of Kalat at a time before the introduction of electricity or motor vehicles, head of a largely nomadic people in a harsh mountain / desert environment, but with a rich tradition of Baluchi, Persian and Muslim culture.

Background to insurgency
In 1955 the various states of Balochistan were dissolved and merged into the province of West Pakistan under the "One Unit" policy.  In 1948, Ahmad Yar Khan, the Khan of Kalat, which was the largest former Baloch princely state, agreed to join Pakistan. The signing of the Instrument of Accession by Ahmad Yar Khan, led his brother, Prince Abdul Karim, to revolt against his brother's decision in July 1948. He along with few of his followers moved to Afghanistan to seek Afghan government support to form an independent Balochistan state. However, Afghan government wanted to annex Balochistan as it was in desperate need of a sea port. Prince Karim, ultimately surrender to Pakistan after period of one year. Prince Karim failed to get any support from Afghan government and also the local Baloch who were not interested in rebelling against the government of Pakistan.

Insurgency and imprisonment
Nowroz Khan's band of fighters, was involved in several sharp skirmishes with forces led by Lt. Col. Tikka Khan. Nowroz agreed to surrender on May 15, 1959 in exchange for amnesty. However, when Nowroz Khan came down from the hills, he and about 150 of his followers, including his sons and nephews, were arrested for insurgency against the state.  

In July 15, 1960 seven of the leaders were executed by hanging in Hyderabad Jail.  

Nowroz was spared execution on account of his age, but died in Kohlu Jail in 1964. 

The Khan of Kalat was subsequently forgiven and freed.

References

Baloch nationalists
Baloch people
People of the insurgency in Balochistan
Nawabs of Balochistan, Pakistan
1870s births
1964 deaths
Nawabs of Pakistan